Paul Holland (born 8 July 1973) is an English former footballer who made over 300 appearances in the Football League for Mansfield Town, Sheffield United, Chesterfield and Bristol City and was capped two times for the England U21s, playing alongside the likes of David Beckham and Robbie Fowler. He is a former manager of Mansfield Town and Ilkeston.

Career
Holland was born in Lincoln. As a player, he was a combative midfielder. He began his career with Mansfield Town, then spent a brief spell with Sheffield United, before joining Chesterfield. In the 1996–97 season, he was part of Chesterfield's historic run to the FA Cup semi-final, coming on as a substitute in both the semi-final and semi-final replay against Middlesbrough. Holland later joined Bristol City, where he suffered a serious knee injury during a match in September 2000, followed by a stress fracture of the kneecap in May 2001. Subsequently, he retired from playing and returned to Mansfield as youth team coach in January 2002. 

He served as the Stags' assistant manager under Peter Shirtliff, and when Shirtliff was dismissed in December 2006, following a run of poor results, Holland was made caretaker manager. He reverted to assistant manager when Billy Dearden was appointed manager nine days later. When Dearden left the club in March 2008, Holland was again appointed caretaker manager. After four matches, he was given the opportunity by the board at Mansfield to stay as manager until the end of the 2007–08 season, with Stephen Booth, chief executive saying, "We have had three good performances out of four under Paul. I am confident in his abilities and hope everyone gets behind him." However, he was unable to prevent Mansfield from being relegated from the Football League and in July 2008, he was sacked with immediate effect.

In 2015, Holland became manager of the amateur side at Aston-on-Trent in Derbyshire. On 23 May 2016, Holland was announced as the new manager of Ilkeston.

In 2017, Holland pleaded guilty to fraud and forgery in relation to his time managing Ilkeston. He was handed two sentences of 24 weeks, to run concurrently, suspended for two years.

He appeared on Countdown on Channel 4 on Wednesday 21 April 2021. He lost his first game but came close, getting the Countdown conundrum correct (BURLESQUE).

Managerial stats

Honours
Individual
 PFA Team of the Year: 1994–95 Third Division

References

External links

1973 births
Living people
People educated at Carre's Grammar School
English footballers
Association football midfielders
English Football League players
Mansfield Town F.C. players
Sheffield United F.C. players
Chesterfield F.C. players
Bristol City F.C. players
English football managers
Mansfield Town F.C. managers